The Big South Conference baseball tournament, sometimes referred to simply as the Big South tournament, is the conference baseball championship of the NCAA Division I Big South Conference.  The top eight finishers in the regular season of the conference's 11 teams advance to the double-elimination tournament, which is currently held at a neutral site at Segra Stadium in Fayetteville, North Carolina, from 2019 to 2021. The winner of the tournament receives an automatic berth to the NCAA Division I Tournament.

Champions

By year
The following is a list of conference champions and sites listed by year.

By school
The following is a list of conference champions listed by school.

 Italics indicate that the program is no longer a Big South member.

References